Harvey William Mason (born February 22, 1947) is an American jazz drummer, record producer, and member of the band Fourplay.

Mason, who attended Berklee in the 1960s, received an Honorary Doctorate at Berklee's 2015 Commencement Ceremony for his achievement and influence in music and for his enduring contributions to American and international culture.

Life and career 
Mason was born and grew up in Atlantic City, New Jersey, United States, and attended Atlantic City High School. He began playing drums at the age of four with the support of his father, a drummer in the army band.

Equipment 
Mason endorses Canopus drums, Murat Diril cymbals, Remo drumheads, DW pedals, and Vic Firth drumsticks. Mason has his own Vic Firth Harvey Mason signature drumstick and Vic Firth Harvey Mason Chameleon signature drumstick.

Discography

As leader 

With Fourplay

As sideman 
With George Benson
 Breezin' (Warner Bros., 1976)
 In Flight (Warner Bros., 1977)
 Collaboration with Earl Klugh (Warner Bros., 1987)
 Guitar Man (Concord Jazz, 2011)

With The Brothers Johnson
Look Out for #1 (A&M, 1976)
Right on Time (A&M, 1977)
Blam! (A&M, 1978)

With Donald Byrd
 Street Lady (Blue Note, 1973)
 Stepping into Tomorrow (Blue Note, 1975) – recorded in 1974
 Places and Spaces (Blue Note, 1975)
 Caricatures (Blue Note, 1976)

With Ron Carter
 Pastels (Milestone, 1976)
 When Skies Are Grey... (Somethin' Else, 2000)

With Casiopea
 4x4 (Alfa, 1982)
 Light and Shadows (Pony Canyon, 1997)

With Herbie Hancock
 Head Hunters (Columbia, 1973)
 Man-Child (Columbia, 1975) – recorded in 1974-75
 Sunlight (Columbia, 1978)
 Mr. Hands (Columbia, 1980)
 Mr. Funk (Columbia, 1998) – Compilation recorded in 1972-88

With Gene Harris
 In a Special Way (Blue Note, 1976)
 Tone Tantrum (Blue Note, 1977)

With Bobbi Humphrey
 Blacks and Blues (Blue Note, 1973)
 Satin Doll (Blue Note, 1974)
 Fancy Dancer (Blue Note, 1975)

With Bob James
 Three (CTI, 1976) – recorded in 1975-76
 One on One (Tappan Zee, 1979)
 In Hi-Fi (Audio Fidelity, 2003)
 Angels of Shanghai (Universal, 2006) – recorded in 2004-05

With Carole King
 Rhymes & Reasons (Ode, 1972)
 Fantasy (Ode, 1973)

With Minnie Riperton
 Minnie (Capitol, 1979)
 Love Lives Forever (Capitol, 1980)

With Lee Ritenour
 Gentle Thoughts (JVC, 1977)
 Captain Fingers (Epic, 1977)
 Sugar Loaf Express (JVC, 1977)
 Earth Run (GRP, 1986)
 Portrait (GRP, 1987)
 Stolen Moments (GRP, 1990)
 Wes Bound (GRP, 1993)	– recorded in 1992
 Overtime (Peak, 2005) – recorded in 2004
 Six String Theory (2010)

With Patrice Rushen
 Before the Dawn (Prestige, 1975)
 Now (Elektra, 1984) – recorded in 1983-84

With Moacir Santos
 Saudade (Blue Note, 1974)
 Carnival of the Spirits (Blue Note, 1975)

With Diane Schuur
 Blues for Schuur (GRP, 1997)
 Midnight (Concord, 2003)

With Stanley Turrentine
 Have You Ever Seen the Rain (Fantasy, 1975)
 Everybody Come On Out (Fantasy, 1976)
 Wonderland (Blue Note, 1984)
 Do You Have Any Sugar? (Concord, 1999)

With Dionne Warwick
Dionne Warwick Sings Cole Porter (Arista, 1990)
Friends Can Be Lovers (Arista, 1993)

With Grover Washington Jr.
 Mister Magic (Kudu, 1975) – recorded in 1974
 A Secret Place (Kudu, 1976)
 The Best Is Yet to Come (Elektra, 1982)

With Bill Withers
 Making Music (CBS, 1975)
 'Bout Love (Columbia, 1979)

With others
 Arthur Adams, I Love Love Love My Lady (A&M, 1979)
 Christina Aguilera, My Kind of Christmas (RCA Records, 2000)
 Herb Alpert, Midnight Sun (A&M, 1992) – rec. 1991-92
 Patti Austin, Love Is Gonna Getcha (GRP, 1990)
 Chet Atkins, Street Dreams (Columbia, 1986)
 Beck, The Information (Idenscope, 2006)
 Mary J. Blige, The Breakthrough (Geffen, 2005)
 Dee Dee Bridgewater, Just Family (Elektra, 1977)
 Irene Cara, Carasmatic (Elektra Records, 1987)
 Keith Carradine, I'm Easy (Asylum, 1976)
 Larry Carlton, Deep into It (Warner Bros., 2001)
 Cher, Stars (Warner Bros. Records, 1975)
 Merry Clayton, Beautiful Scars (Motown, 2021)
 Natalie Cole, Stardust (Elektra Records, 1996)
 Rita Coolidge, Behind the Memories (Canyon, 1996)
 Chick Corea, The Mad Hatter (Polydor, 1978)
 Terence Trent D'Arby, Symphony or Damn (Columbia, 1993)
 The 5th Dimension, Earthbound (ABC, 1975)
 Earth, Wind & Fire, Spirit (Columbia, 1976)
 Miles Davis & Michel Legrand, Dingo (Warner Bros., 1991)
 Charles Earland, Leaving This Planet (Prestige, 1974) – recorded in 1973
 Joe Farrell, Night Dancing (Warner Bros., 1978)
 Victor Feldman, Audiophile (JVC, 1997)
 Roberta Flack, Oasis (Atlantic, 1988)
 Robben Ford, Bringing It Back Home (Provogue, 2013)
 Michael Franks, Objects of Desire (Warner Bros. Records, 1982)
 Hiroshi Fukumura with Sadao Watanabe, Hunt Up Wind (Flying Disk, 1978)
 Terry Garthwaite, Terry (Arista, 1975)
 Lesley Gore, Love Me By Name (A&M, 1976)
 Dave Grusin and Lee Ritenour, Harlequin (GRP, 1985)
 Don Grusin, The Hang (Sovereign Artists, 2004)
 Lani Hall, Blush (A&M, 1980)
 Tramaine Hawkins, To a Higher Place (Columbia, 1994)
 The Headhunters, Survival of the Fittest (Arista, 1975)
 Eddie Henderson, Sunburst (Blue Note, 1975)
 Joe Henderson, Black Miracle (Milestone, 1976) – recorded in 1975
 Bobby Hutcherson, Montara (Blue Note, 1975)
 Yosui Inoue, Nishoku no Koma (Polydor, 1974)
 Jessy J, Hot Sauce (Heads Up International, 2011)
 Ahmad Jamal, Genetic Walk (20th Century, 1980) – recorded in 1975
 Jamiroquai, Dynamite (Epic, 2005)
 Jack Jones, New Jack Swing (Linn, 1997)
 The Keane Brothers, The Keane Brothers (20th Century, 1977)
 Eddie Kendricks, The Hit Man (Tamla, 1975)
 Earl Klugh, Earl Klugh (Blue Note, 1974)
 Patti LaBelle, Winner in You (MCA Records, 1986)
 Hubert Laws, The San Francisco Concert (CTI, 1977) – live recorded in 1975
 Peggy Lee, Let's Love (Atlantic, 1974)
 John Legend, Once Again (Sony Urban, 2006)
 Chuck Loeb, Plain 'n' Simple (Tweety, 2011)
 Kenny Loggins, Celebrate Me Home (Columbia, 1977) – recorded in 1975-76
 Jackie Lomax, Livin' For Lovin''' (Capitol Records, 1976)
 Jon Lucien, Song for My Lady (Columbia, 1975)
 Cheryl Lynn, Cheryl Lynn (Columbia Records, 1978)
 Barry Manilow, Showstoppers (Arista, 1991)
 Wade Marcus, Metamorphosis (ABC, 1976)
 Michael McDonald, Motown (Motown, 2003)
 Lonette McKee, Words and Music (Warner Bros., 1978)
 Carmen McRae, Can't Hide Love (Blue Note, 1976)
 Luis Miguel, Aries (Warner Bros., 1993)
 Tim Moore, White Shadows (Asylum Records, 1977)
 Gerry Mulligan and Chet Baker, Carnegie Hall Concert (CTI, 1975) – recorded in 1974
 Walter Murphy, Walter Murphy's Discosymphony (New York, 1979)
 David "Fathead" Newman, Scratch My Back (Prestige, 1979)
 Joe Pass, Whitestone (Pablo, 1985)
 Esther Phillips, All About (Mercury, 1978)
 Michele Pillar, I Hear Angels Calling (335, 2006)
 Daniel Powter, Under the Radar (Warner Bros. Records, 2008)
 Helen Reddy, Music, Music (Capitol, 1976)
 Lee Ritenour & Larry Carlton, Larry & Lee (GRP, 1995)
 Rufus, Numbers (ABC, 1979)
 Véronique Sanson, Le Maudit (Warner Bros., 1974)
 Masahiko Satoh, All-In All-Out (CBS, 1979)
 Seals and Crofts, Diamond Girl (Warner Bros., 1973)
 Marlena Shaw, Who Is This Bitch, Anyway? (Blue Note, 1975) – recorded in 1974
 Phoebe Snow, It Looks Like Snow (Columbia Records, 1976)
 Rod Stewart, It Had to Be You: The Great American Songbook (BMG, 2002)
 Tavares, Supercharged (Capitol, 1980)
 The Manhattan Transfer, Tonin' (Atlantic Records, 1995)
 Johnny "Hammond" Smith, Gears (Milestone, 1975)
 Donna Summer, Donna Summer (Geffen, 1982) – recorded in 1981-82
 Gábor Szabó, Macho (Salvation, 1975)
 Jimmy Webb, El Mirage (Atlantic, 1977)
 Joe Williams, Feel the Spirit (Telarc, 1995)
 Vanessa Williams, The Comfort Zone (Mercury, 1991)
 Gary Wright, Headin' Home (Warner Bros., 1979)
 Syreeta Wright, Syreeta'' (Tamla Records, 1980)

References

External links 

1947 births
Living people
Atlantic City High School alumni
Musicians from Atlantic City, New Jersey
American jazz drummers
Jazz-funk drummers
Crossover jazz drummers
American disco musicians
American rock drummers
American funk drummers
American session musicians
Musicians from Los Angeles
20th-century American drummers
American male drummers
Jazz musicians from California
20th-century American male musicians
American male jazz musicians
Fourplay members
The Headhunters members
Berklee College of Music alumni